Faratan (also Romanized as Farātān and Ferātān; also known as Farāţūn) is a village in Arabkhaneh Rural District, Shusef District, Nehbandan County, South Khorasan Province, Iran. At the 2006 census, its population was 148, in 39 families.

References 

Populated places in Nehbandan County